Fluvanna may refer to:
Fluvanna County, Virginia
Fluvanna, Texas
Fluvanna (horse), American Champion racehorse
Fluvanna Correctional Center for Women